Sam A. Mayer (born June 26, 2003) is an American professional stock car racing driver. He competes full-time in the NASCAR Xfinity Series, driving the No. 1 Chevrolet Camaro for JR Motorsports, a team in which he is also a development driver for through their Drivers Edge Development program. His father is former IndyCar Series driver Scott Mayer.

Mayer is the 2019 and 2020 East Series champion. He drove for GMS Racing (the other Drivers Edge Development team) both of those years in their No. 21 car and also won the inaugural championship of the ARCA Menards Series Sioux Chief Showdown in 2020. Mayer started his NASCAR career driving for Jefferson Pitts Racing and MDM Motorsports in 2018 before joining GMS, JRM, and Chevrolet as a development driver in 2019.

Racing career

Mayer got off to an early start in racing, competing in go-kart events at the age of four. Although his father, Scott Mayer, was an open-wheel racer, Sam chose in his preteen years to focus on stock car racing. Over the course of the 2017 summer, during which Mayer turned fourteen, he spent the summer in Charlotte to race Legends cars; he won the Young Lions division of the Charlotte Motor Speedway Summer Shootout. He also raced in a Limited Late Model and won at Greenville-Pickens Speedway to become the track's youngest winner. He came back to Wisconsin and won a September Midwest Truck Series race at Dells Raceway Park in his first series start.

In 2017, Mayer came in touch with industry veteran Lorin Ranier, who eventually landed Mayer a late model ride with JR Motorsports in the CARS Tour for 2018. Mayer's late model racing also brought him to the World Series of Asphalt, where he finished second to Stephen Nasse. Ranier also led Mayer to MDM Motorsports for a limited slate in the ARCA Racing Series and NASCAR K&N Pro Series East in the back half of 2018, with age restrictions being a factor in which races Mayer could run, as both series only let 15-year-old competitors race on certain tracks. In his first ARCA race, Mayer ran as high as third and finished inside the top-ten. After the CARS Tour season was over, Mayer was voted the series' Most Popular Driver for 2018. The CARS Tour season included one victory, at Wake County Speedway.

On December 5, 2018, it was announced that Mayer would run a full NASCAR K&N Pro Series East schedule with GMS Racing as part of a 2019 schedule that would also include seven ARCA races and four NASCAR Gander Outdoors Truck Series races with the team. All four of the Truck races will come after Mayer turns sixteen; his debut is slated to be at Bristol Motor Speedway in August. That race would be followed by appearances at Canadian Tire Motorsport Park, Martinsville Speedway and ISM Raceway.

Mayer scored his first K&N East win at Bristol on April 6, 2019, leading every lap. He nearly scored his first ARCA Menards Series win at Gateway in June after a late pit gamble, but was moved up the track by Ty Gibbs in the final set of corners and was relegated to third. In October, he won the 2019 K&N East championship to become the youngest NASCAR champion at 16 years, 3 months, and 8 days; the previous record was 16 years and 5 months by Todd Gilliland in 2016. Mayer ended the 2019 season with four wins and top tens in all but one race.

While racing in the ARCA Menards Series and ARCA Menards Series East in 2020, Mayer made a TA2 Trans-Am start at Road America and suffered a hairline fracture in his wrist during a race-ending crash. The injury forced Colin Braun to sub in for Mayer midway through the AMS race at the Daytona International Speedway road course. Mayer later won ARCA's first trip to Lebanon I-44 Speedway.

On September 15, 2020, Mayer and JR Motorsports announced an agreement to have him drive one of the organization's NASCAR Xfinity Series cars part-time in the latter portion of 2021 and full-time in the 2022 season. Two days later, Mayer swept the night at Bristol, winning both the Truck Series and ARCA race. He overcame a pit miscue to claim the checkered flag in the ARCA event. Mayer won the East finale at Five Flags Speedway to capture the series championship with an average finish of 1.2 on the season.

On January 14, 2021, defending ARCA champion Bret Holmes announced he would begin fielding a part-time Truck Series team, the No. 32, for himself and Mayer for the upcoming season. In addition, Mayer would also drive select races in Bret Holmes Racing's No. 23 car in the ARCA Menards Series and ARCA Menards Series East. Three days later on January 17, it was also announced that Mayer would run seven races in the No. 75 for Henderson Motorsports in the Truck Series, beginning at the Daytona Road Course, which would end up being his only start with Henderson Motorsports.

On January 4, 2022, it was confirmed that Sam Mayer would drive the JR Motorsports No. 1 in 2022, replacing Michael Annett. At the Martinsville spring race on April 8, Mayer finished fifth after doing a bump and run on Ty Gibbs on the final lap. After the race, Gibbs attempted to spin Mayer out during the cool-down laps before both drivers engaged in a fistfight on pit road.

Motorsports career results

NASCAR
(key) (Bold – Pole position awarded by qualifying time. Italics – Pole position earned by points standings or practice time. * – Most laps led. ** – All laps led.)

Xfinity Series

Camping World Truck Series

 Season still in progress
 Ineligible for series points

ARCA Menards Series
(key) (Bold – Pole position awarded by qualifying time. Italics – Pole position earned by points standings or practice time. * – Most laps led.)

ARCA Menards Series East

ARCA Menards Series West

References

External links
 
 

2003 births
Sportspeople from the Milwaukee metropolitan area
Racing drivers from Milwaukee
Racing drivers from Wisconsin
NASCAR drivers
ARCA Menards Series drivers
Living people
People from Franklin, Milwaukee County, Wisconsin
JR Motorsports drivers